Yolaine Yengo (born 24 April 1993) is a French rugby union, and rugby sevens player. She plays for the University of Rennes and for Stade Rennais Rugby.

Biography 
Yengo played for New Caledonia at the 2015 Pacific Games. She was selected as a member of the France women's national rugby sevens team at the 2021 Dubai Women's Sevens. She won a bronze medal at the 2022 Rugby World Cup Sevens.

References 

1993 births

Living people
French rugby sevens players
French rugby union players
France international women's rugby sevens players